"Wild Child" is a single by American heavy metal band W.A.S.P. Written by Blackie Lawless and Chris Holmes, it serves as the intro track off their second studio album The Last Command and was released as the third single. The song charted at number 71 on the UK Singles Chart.

Music video
The music video starts off with vocalist Blackie Lawless riding a motorcycle on a desert highway. He then spots a woman wearing a red jumpsuit standing on a cliff-edge who disappears as soon as he sees her. The video then cuts to the band performing the song on the top of a cliff and concludes with Lawless encountering the woman again at nightfall, who again fades into thin air upon being seen by him. Lawless then rides his motorcycle through the path of her disappearance, leaving a trail of flames behind him. 

The music video was directed by Rick Friedberg.

Track listing
7" single

12" single

Legacy
Finnish guitarist and vocalist Alexi Laiho, a fan of the band in his formative years, took himself a nickname "Wildchild" after the song.

The song is included on the soundtrack of the 2018 film Widows.

Charts

References

W.A.S.P. songs
Capitol Records singles
1986 singles
1986 songs